"Too Much" is a #1 song recorded in a hit version by Elvis Presley and published by Elvis Presley Music in 1956. It was written by Bernard Weinman and Lee Rosenberg. It was first released in 1955 by Bernard Hardison on Republic Records. Presley recorded the song in September 1956 and first performed it on January 6, 1957, on CBS-TV's The Ed Sullivan Show. Released as a single, Presley's "Too Much" reached number one on both the Cashbox and Billboard sales charts and went to number three on the R&B chart. The single peaked at number two on the then-named Top 100 chart, the main Billboard pop chart.

Charts and certifications

References

Elvis Presley songs
1957 singles
1954 songs
RCA Victor singles